Abu Zayd Abd al-Rahman Mohammed al-Jadiri (born in Meknes, in 1375 and died in Fez, probably in 1416) was the  (time-keeper) at the Qarawiyyin Mosque. 

References

Sources
 
 

Moroccan writers
Medieval Moroccan astronomers
Astronomers of the medieval Islamic world
1375 births
1416 deaths
People from Meknes
14th-century Moroccan people
15th-century Moroccan people
People from Fez, Morocco